Sanistand was a female urinal manufactured by Japanese toilet maker giant TOTO from 1951 to 1971 and marketed by American Standard from 1950 to 1973. It appeared in a bathroom in the National Stadium for female athletes during the 1964 Summer Olympics in Tokyo. The urinal encouraged women to urinate from a standing position, without the need to sit on a shared seat.

See also
Female urinal
Female urination device
Pollee

External links
 TOTO Library article, March 20, 2000 
 TOTO Kids article on female urinals
 Background Information on female urinals 

Toilets
Products introduced in 1951
Urine
Urinals